The 2016 Indiana Democratic presidential primary took place on May 3 in the U.S. state of Indiana as one of the Democratic Party's primaries ahead of the 2016 presidential election.

The Republican Party held their own Indiana primary on the same day. Other primaries were not held that day.

Opinion polling

Results

Analysis
Sanders managed a five-percentage point upset win in Indiana, despite not leading in a single poll ahead of the primary. He won men 57-43, tied women with Clinton 50-50, beat Clinton 68-32 among voters under the age of 45, and won a resounding 59-41 victory with white voters, who made up 71% of the Democratic electorate in Indiana. He also won self-identified Independents 72-28 and won across all income levels. Clinton performed best with African Americans who she won 74-26, and older voters who she won 60-40.

Sanders performed well statewide in Indiana, winning most of the rural counties. He performed well in Marion County, winning 51-49 according to exit polls. Marion contains the state capital and largest city of Indianapolis, and the Indianapolis Suburbs which he won 56-44. Sanders won Northeast Indiana, which is anchored in Allen County by Fort Wayne.  Sanders carried East Central Indiana and Northern Indiana. He carried St. Joseph County which contains South Bend and University of Notre Dame by a wide margin, likely thanks to his support from younger voters. He also won Monroe County which contains the city of Bloomington which is home to Indiana University. Sanders also won Vanderburgh County which contains Evansville as well as Vigo County which contains Terre Haute.

Clinton won Lake County in Northwest Indiana (a region she won by a narrow 51-49) which contains the heavily African American city of Gary and is a part of the Chicago Metropolitan Area, and performed well in Southern Indiana along the Ohio River with neighboring Kentucky.

References

Indiana
Democratic primary
2016